Alfred Webb (1878 – 25 August 1932) was an English professional footballer who made 131 appearances in the Football League playing for Lincoln City as a goalkeeper.

Webb worked as a coal miner and played for Mansfield before joining Lincoln in the 1899 close season. He made 144 appearances for the club in all senior competitions, and later played for Mansfield Mechanics.

References

1878 births
1932 deaths
English footballers
Association football goalkeepers
Lincoln City F.C. players
Mansfield Mechanics F.C. players
English Football League players